Simon Calder (born 25 December 1955) is a freelance UK travel journalist and broadcaster.  He works for various news and travel publications as well as being travel correspondent for The Independent.

Biography
In 1962, Calder joined the Woodcraft Folk and travelled with the group to the Lake District. That same year, after the USSR sent nuclear warheads to Cuba, Calder's parents decided that with Gatwick Airport only two miles away they were in the line of a potential Soviet target. The family moved to Guernsey, for a short holiday while the danger passed. The school he attended, Thomas Bennett in Crawley, compulsorily taught Russian, which Calder comments was not useful on regular school and family trips to France.

Calder's first job was a cleaner for British Airways at Gatwick and later as a security guard. He began writing budget travel guidebooks during this period, starting with the Hitch-hiker's Manual: Britain. He later studied for a degree in mathematics at the University of Warwick, while also indulging his love of hitchhiking around Europe. At one point he was the holder of the record for the quickest hitchhike between Land's End and John o' Groats.

After university, Calder briefly taught mathematics in Crawley before getting a job as a radio engineer with the BBC in London. Calder wrote several books and series of guides including the Traveller's Survival Kit series and Backpacks, Boots and Baguettes. His first broadcast as a travel expert was on Simon Bates' programme Studio B15 on BBC Radio 1 in 1980.

Calder became travel correspondent for The Independent in 1994 and shortly afterwards began presenting for BBC 2's Travel Show alongside Penny Junor until the programme ended in 1999. He then contributed to several BBC 1 shows, including Perfect Holiday and Departure Lounge. Calder presented the final film in the last edition of the long-running Holiday programme in 2007.

Calder's articles have featured in many publications including Condé Nast Traveller, The Evening Standard, High Life (BA’s inflight magazine), and the trade publication Travel Trade Gazette.

He continues to contribute to various BBC programmes, including as the 'Global Guru' on BBC News' The Travel Show and on Rip Off Britain. He is also a presenter of short films, and as an expert providing advice to consumers. He regularly comments as an expert on travel issues for other radio and TV stations, including for Channel 5 on their Britain's Travel Chaos - How To Save Your Summer documentary in 2022. Calder presented The Travel Show, a weekly travel phone-in on the London talk radio station LBC, for four years until April 2012. He has a weekly podcast called "You Should Have Been There" and he regularly tweets travel information on @SimonCalder.

Family
Calder is the son of science writer Nigel Calder and the grandson of Lord Ritchie-Calder. He is the nephew of the Scottish writer and critic Angus Calder and educationalist Isla Calder (1946-2000).

Calder married Charlotte in Las Vegas in 1997. He has two daughters (born in 2000 and 2003) and lives in London.

Travel
In 1986, Calder made his only flight on Concorde. In 2006, Calder travelled more than 5700 miles by rail across Russia from Moscow in the west to Vladivostok in the east, on the Trans-Siberian Railway.

Calder has travelled to more than 120 countries and lists Northern Ireland, Yorkshire and Hadrian's Wall in Northumberland among his favourite places to visit.

Books
Hitch-hiker's Manual: Britain (4 Feb 1985),  
U. S. A. and Canada Travellers Survival Kit (1 Feb 1997) 
Cuba in Focus: a guide to the people, politics and culture. (1999) 
Backpacks, Boots and Baguettes: A Walk in the Pyrenees (9 Dec 2004), 
No Frills: The Truth Behind the Low-Cost Revolution in the Skies (6 Feb 2008), 
48 HOURS IN EUROPEAN CAPITALS: How to Enjoy the Perfect Short Break in 20 Great Cities (21 Dec 2015),

Awards
In 2012 Calder won the Outstanding Achievement and Broadcast Journalist of the Year at the 2012 Travel Press Awards and also the News Journalist of the Year for Print at the 2012 Business Travel Journalism Awards.

Calder won the 2011 Christmas edition of Celebrity Mastermind, with Concorde as his specialist subject.

References

External links

1955 births
Alumni of the University of Warwick
Living people
British travel writers
Travel broadcasters
Guernsey writers
People from Crawley
English people of Scottish descent
The Independent people
Simon